Mury ("The Walls") was a Polish female anti-Nazi resistance group. Mury may also refer to:

 "Mury" (song), 1978 Polish protest song
 Saint-Mury-Monteymond, commune in Isère, France

See also
 Murie (disambiguation)
 Murry (disambiguation)